Dulce María Téllez Palacio (born September 12, 1983) is a Cuban volleyball player who competed in the 2004 Summer Olympics.

In 2004, she was a member of the Cuban team that won the bronze medal in the Olympic tournament.

Clubs
 Mets de Guaynabo (2010-2011)

External links
 

1983 births
Living people
Cuban women's volleyball players
Olympic volleyball players of Cuba
Volleyball players at the 2004 Summer Olympics
Olympic bronze medalists for Cuba
Olympic medalists in volleyball
Medalists at the 2004 Summer Olympics
Sportspeople from Santiago de Cuba
Cuban emigrants to Puerto Rico
Puerto Rican women's volleyball players
Defecting sportspeople of Cuba